National Defence College is a government owned institution for the strategic training of civil and military officers and is located in Mirpur Cantonment, Dhaka, Bangladesh.

History
The college was established on 7 December 1996 and started its operations on 10 January 1999.

Armed Forces War College 
Armed Forces War College was established in 2001 under the National Defence College. It is headed by the Commandant of the National Defence College.

Notable alumni
 Lieutenant general Tukur Yusuf Buratai the Chief of Staff Nigerian Army (2015–2021).
 Major General K.J.Wijetilleke- Sri Lankan general.
 Air Marshal Jasjit Singh Kler VM, Director General (Inspection and Safety) of Indian Air Force.
 Lieutenant General Alok Singh Kler, VSM, General Officer Commanding-in-Chief, South Western Command, Indian Army

References

1996 establishments in Bangladesh
Organisations based in Dhaka
Bangladesh Armed Forces education and training establishments
War colleges
National Defence College (Bangladesh)